Tout est possible! Les gauchistes français 1929–1944 is a 1974 history book of French leftism by Jean Rabaut.

Bibliography 

 
 
 
 

1974 non-fiction books
French-language books
History books about France
Books about labor history